The 2011–12 season will be Nottingham Forest Football Club's 4th consecutive season in the Championship. Nottingham Forest's expectations were to once again seek promotion from the Championship. However, the season was spent in a relegation battle which they survived meaning they will once again compete in the Championship. Forest also competed in the FA Cup and the League Cup, being knocked out in the third round of both.

Key events
12 June 2011: Billy Davies's contract was terminated with the club.
13 June 2011: Steve McClaren became the new Nottingham Forest manager.
14 June 2011: Young players Nialle Rodney and Mark Byrne were released from their contracts, with Byrne joining Barnet, and Rodney going to Bradford City.
16 June 2011: Forest were drawn against local rivals Notts County in the first round of the League Cup. Assistant manager David Kelly, first team coach Julian Darby, assistant first team coach Chris Fairclough, performance coach Darren Robinson and goalkeeping coach Pete Williams all left Forest.
1 July 2011: Dele Adebola joined Hull City after his contract expired, and it was confirmed Kelvin Wilson and Nathan Tyson joined Celtic and Derby County respectively. Paul McKenna was also released from his contract so he could join Hull City.
2 July 2011: Forest made their first signing of the season with Andy Reid joining for free from Blackpool.
5 July 2011: Julian Bennett joined Sheffield Wednesday after his contract expired.
6 July 2011: Robert Earnshaw joined Cardiff City, his hometown club, after his contract expired.
18 July 2011: Fulham midfielder Jonathan Greening signed a three-year deal at Forest. The fee was £600,000.
19 July 2011: Guy Moussi signs a new contract, keeping him at Forest until 2014.
20 July 2011: Midfielder George Boateng signed a one-year contract deal at Forest on a free transfer.
29 July 2011: Forest appointed Rob Kelly to the post of assistant manager, while also confirming the appointments of Jimmy Floyd Hasselbaink, Bill Bestwick, Paul Barron and Alessandro Schoenmaker.
10 August 2011: Striker Matt Derbyshire signed from Olympiacos for an undisclosed fee.
15 August 2011: Ishmael Miller was signed by Forest on a three-year deal for £1.2m from Premier League side West Bromwich Albion.
31 August 2011: Striker Joe Garner joined Watford for an undisclosed fee.
9 September 2011: Young goalkeeper Ben Gathercole joined Ilkeston on loan for a month and it was announced that Karlton Watson has joined Eastwood Town for month on loan.
15 September 2011: Striker David McGoldrick went on loan to Sheffield Wednesday for a month.
22 September 2011: Forest signed Clint Hill on an emergency loan from Queens Park Rangers.
2 October 2011: Manager Steve McClaren resigned from the club.
2 October 2011: Nigel Doughty announced his resignation as Chairman after 10 years at the club.
13 October 2011: Frank Clark was announced as the new Chairman of Nottingham Forest.
17 October 2011: Steve Cotterill was confirmed as the new manager of Forest.
25 October 2011: Forest signed Greg Cunningham from Manchester City on an emergency loan.
4 November 2011: Youngster Kieron Freeman joined Mansfield Town on an emergency loan.
1 January 2012: Marlon Harewood returned to Forest from Guangzhou R&F and signed a four-month contract until the end of the season.
30 January 2012: Wes Morgan left Forest and signed for Leicester City, for an undisclosed fee.
30 January 2012: Adlène Guedioura signed for Forest on loan for the remainder of the season, from Wolverhampton Wanderers.
31 January 2012: Young player Patrick Bamford signed for Chelsea for an undisclosed fee.
31 January 2012: Forest made two deadline day loan signings, with Danny Higginbotham coming from Stoke City and Scott Wootton from Manchester United. Both signed for the remainder of the season
4 February 2012: Nottingham Forest Owner Nigel Doughty died at his home in Lincolnshire
9 February 2012: Forest signed George Elokobi on loan from Wolverhampton Wanderers for the remainder of the season

Players

Squad information

Transfers in

Transfers out

1Fee was officially reported as Undisclosed.

Loans in

Loans out

Squad statistics

Appearances and goals
This is a list of the First Team players from the 2011–12 season.

|}

Top scorers
Includes all competitive matches. The list is sorted by league goals when total goals are equal.Last updated on 12 May 2012Disciplinary record 
Includes all competitive matches. Players with one card or more included only.Last updated on 12 May 2012''

Club

Coaching staff

 Jimmy Floyd Hasselbaink

Kit

The kits shown here are those of the 2011–12 season. The Home and Goalkeeper Home kits were worn for the first time in the first home game, against Barnsley. The Away Alternative is a combination of the Away shirt, Home shorts and last season's Away socks, and was worn in the away match at Doncaster Rovers. The Away kit was debuted at Southampton away and the Goalkeeper away at Wycombe Wanderers away in the League Cup. All the kits had the same Umbro and Victor Chandler logos across the front of them.

|
|
|
|
|
|

Other information

Competitions

Overall

Championship

Table

Results summary

Results by round

Matches

Competitive

Championship

Last updated: 28 April 2012Source: Nottingham Forest F.C.

League Cup

Last updated: 30 September 2011Source: Nottingham Forest F.C.

FA Cup

Last updated: 17 January 2012Source: Nottingham Forest F.C.

Pre-season

Last updated: 30 July 2016Source: Nottingham Forest F.C.

References

Nottingham Forest F.C. seasons
Nottingham Forest